ByBox is an international software and supply chain management company with its headquarters in Slough, Berkshire.

History

ByBox' was founded in February 2000 with the acquisition of Logibag SAS by Stuart Miller. It then merged with Dynamid one year later on 1 February 2001.

It spent the next few years building an electronic dropbox network and establishing a presence in the field service engineering market. In 2003, ByBox agreed to a five-year deal with Hays to provide it with 335 banks of electronic boxes. But only 12 weeks later Hays decided to break up the company.

ByBox then acquired the Field Service division of Hays PLC; Hays had a network of 10,000 mechanical lockers in 500 locations. However, as ByBox did not have its own distribution network it negotiated a deal to use the Hays network for 12 weeks. ByBox then intended to get a distribution partner, but with 11 weeks to spare decided to set up their own distribution network to control consistency across the company, to do this they opened 9 distribution centres across the UK.

In the few years following the acquisition of Field Service division of Hays, ByBox moved its national hub from Rugby to a new  hub in Coventry, its Normanton DC to Doncaster as well as relocating other DCs to larger premises.

Executive Directors 
Stuart Miller, CEO  Steve Huxter, COO  Pete Rowse, CFO  Mark Garritt MD ByBox Field Service  Kevin Hole, Finance Director  Claudine Mosseri, Group Services Director  Andy Crees, Group Operations Director

Key metrics
2015 revenue: £68m.
Employees: 500
Net Promoter Score: +94 (world-class)

Acquisitions
2000 – Logibag SAS: global leader in electronic networked lockers)
2001 – Dynamid: locker-based technology for the home 
2003 – Partspeed: field service division of Hays PLC  
2007 – Bearbox – UK locker network 
2009 – NewcoTech: field technicians (swap-outs) 
2012 – PPR: field technicians (projects) 
2013 – Echo: field technicians (break-fix) 
2014 – Business Direct: UK locker network.

References

Companies based in Oxfordshire
Companies based in Coventry